Old Huntington High School is a historic high school building located at Huntington, Cabell County, West Virginia. It was built in 1916, and is a -story buff-brick building in the Classical Revival style. It consists of a long rectangle with a shorter rectangular wing on each end of the main rectangle forming a "U" shape.  The courtyard is enclosed with three additions completed in 1951 (gymnasium), 1956 (cafeteria), and 1977. The building contains  of space. The kitchen is located in an older red brick building built in 1916, built originally as a carriage house.  The last graduating class was in 1996. A new facility was built to consolidate Old Huntington High and Huntington East High School into a single institution; the new school opened in August 1996 as Huntington High School.  It is now known as The Renaissance Center. Part of the building was converted into apartments. The YMCA uses part of it for workout facilities and a daycare facility. The building also houses studio space, an auditorium, and small art gallery.

It was listed on the National Register of Historic Places in 2000.

Alumni
 Bruce R. Evans (born c. 1959),  venture capitalist, corporate director and philanthropist
Dagmar, an American actress, model and television personality of the 1950s.
Soupy Sales, comedian and entertainer, notable panelist on the television hit What's My Line?

References

Neoclassical architecture in West Virginia
Former school buildings in the United States
Defunct schools in West Virginia
National Register of Historic Places in Cabell County, West Virginia
School buildings completed in 1916
Schools in Cabell County, West Virginia
School buildings on the National Register of Historic Places in West Virginia
Buildings and structures in Huntington, West Virginia
1916 establishments in West Virginia